Kaleyra is a US-listed global Communications Platform as a Service (CPaaS) company that provides API and visual tools to communicate with customers worldwide through various channels, including SMS, MMS, RCS, WhatsApp for Business, Video, and Voice. Kaleyra's services also include access to virtual numbers (toll-free, local and mobile), lookup services, and integration plugins. Kaleyra serves as a partner for Google's services, Verified SMS and Verified Calls.

History
The company was founded in 1999 as Ubiquity in Italy by Dario Calogero, the current CEO and Board of Directors’ member and rebranded to Kaleyra  after acquiring the Indian company Solutions Infini  in 2016. In 2018, Kaleyra acquired the US-based company Buc Mobile, which owned Hook Mobile. It became a listed company in NYSE American  (NYSE:KLR) in November 2019.

In June 2021, Kaleyra acquired US-based mobile messaging solution provider mGage for $215 million in cash and Kaleyra common stock and became a Tier-1 messaging provider in the United States.

In July 2021, Kaleyra acquired Bandyer a leader in Europe for Audio and Video APIs and SDKs. The exact terms of the deal, acquisition costs, were not disclosed.

In August 2021, Kaleyra's common stock shares were approved for uplisting to the New York Stock Exchange from its previous listing on the NYSE American.`

In February 2023 in Ireland, Kaleyra pleaded guilty to 22 charges relating to breaches of the Communications Regulation Act.  This was as a result of a malware incident that led to so-called 'spoofing' which saw customers' numbers being falsely signed up for premium rate services between August 2021 and continued until January 2022.  Following this, Kaleyra withdrew from the Irish market.

References

Cloud communication platforms
Companies listed on the New York Stock Exchange
2019 initial public offerings
Information technology companies of the United States